The 2021–22 FIBA Europe Cup was the seventh season of the FIBA Europe Cup, a European professional basketball competition for clubs, that was launched by FIBA. The season began on 13 October 2021 and ended on 27 April 2022 with the 2022 FIBA Europe Cup Finals.

Bahçeşehir Koleji won their first league title.

Team allocation
14 teams eliminated in the Basketball Champions League qualification rounds could join directly the regular season, depending on their decision as declared in the FIBA Europe Cup option form.
The following 9 teams chose the option of ending their continental adventure if they were eliminated from the Champions League qualifying rounds and therefore refuse to participate in the FIBA Europe Cup:

  Levski Lukoil
  Split
  AEK Larnaca
  Kalev/Cramo
  Salon Vilpas
  Le Mans
  Brose Bamberg
  Juventus
  Fribourg Olympic

Teams
On 26 July 2021, the list of 33 registered clubs was announced by FIBA Europe.
1st, 2nd, etc.: Place in the domestic competition
CL QR1, QR2, QR3: Losers from the Champions League qualifying rounds
TH: FIBA Europe Cup title holders

Schedule 
The schedule of the competition will be as follows.

Qualifying rounds

Draw
The nineteen teams will be divided into 5 pots. For the quarter-finals round of Qualifications, teams from Pot 5 will be drawn against teams from Pot 4. Clubs from Pot 1, 2 and 3 will be seeded, and will enter directly in the semi-final stage of Qualifications. Teams from pot 1 will face the winners from the quarter-finals round, and teams from pot 3 will be drawn against teams from Pot 2. The winners of the semi-final stage will face each other in the finals of Qualifications. The four winners of the finals will then qualify for the Regular season and join the fourteen directly qualified teams and the fourteen Basketball Champions League eliminated teams in the main draw.

Qualification Group A
Venue: MartiniPlaza, Groningen

Qualification Group B
Venue: Triaditza Hall, Sofia

Qualification Group C
Venue: Arena Sever, Krasnoyarsk

Qualification Group D
Venue: Pärnu Sports Hall, Pärnu

Lucky losers
Following the qualification of U-BT Cluj-Napoca and Prometey to the Champions League, two lucky losers will also qualify for the regular season. Their identity will be determined in accordance with section D from FIBA Basketball Rules as follows:
 Point difference of the combined results from the Semi-Finals and Finals will be used as the first criterion. 
 Points scored in the Semi-Finals and Finals will be used as the second criterion.
 If the identity of the two is not determined using the previous two criteria, a draw will be held to determine the final classification.

Regular season

Draw
The draw took place in Freising, Germany at 12:00 CET of August 19.

The thirty-two teams will be divided into 4 Seeds and will be drawn into eight groups of four. a maximum of two clubs from the same country can be in the same group. In each group, teams play against each other home-and-away in a round-robin format. The group winners and runners-up advance to the second round, while the third-placed teams and fourth-placed teams are eliminated. Additionally, Based on a decision of the Board of FIBA Europe, clubs from Russia and Ukraine will be drawn into separate groups in the Draw for the Regular Season.

Notes

 Indicates teams qualified for BCL Regular Season, and two runners-up of the FEC Qualifiers filled their spots.

Group A

Group B

Group C

Group D

Group E

Group F

Group G

Group H

Second round

Group I

Group J

Group K

Group L

Play-offs

The playoffs began on 9 March 2022 and ended on 27 April 2022 with the 2022 FIBA Europe Cup Finals.

Quarterfinals
The first legs were played on 9 and 10 March 2022, and the second legs were played on 16 March 2022.

Semifinals
The first legs were played on 30 March 2022, and the second legs were played on 6 April 2022.

Finals

The first leg was played on 20 April 2022, and the second leg was played on 27 April 2022.

See also 
2021–22 EuroLeague
2021–22 EuroCup Basketball
2021–22 Basketball Champions League

References

External links
Official website

 
FIBA Europe Cup